Dencio's Bar and Grill, simply referred to as Dencio's, is a group of restaurants based in the Philippines.

History

Dennis Nakpil and Dennis Mariano Jr. thought of creating a restaurant that emphasizes certain Philippine traditions. Their principle was "bringing the BARRIO into the metropolis." Thus, they opened one in Quezon City in 1991. They named it Dencio's. Dencio is a Philippine variant of Dennis, the name of the two founders.

To buy the chain, almost all that money ( or 93.75% of the price) had to be borrowed from banks.

Pugad Dencio's
Some characters from Pugad Baboy, a famous comic strip in the Philippines, are portrayed in Dencio's ads and menus. This was a concept proposed by two officials of the chain. It was believed though that the comic characters and the restaurant chain make a more perceived image of the local table custom. They call this Pugad Dencio's. This form of advertisement also goes with a song which is performed by rock band Sugarfree.

References

External links
Official website

Restaurant chains in the Philippines
Restaurants established in 1991
Companies based in Makati
1991 establishments in the Philippines